Latham Augustus Withall OBE (1853 - 1925) was a British architect who practised in Adelaide, South Australia from 1876 to 1888.

While in Adelaide he was for a time in partnership with Ernest Bayer, then with Alfred Wells.
Work with Wells included the Adelaide Arcade and Thebarton Town Hall in 1885, and the Jubilee Exhibition Building in 1886. After Withall and his family returned to England in 1888, Wells and the firm designed the new (1892) Stock Exchange Building, and the Angas and Allen Campbell Buildings of the Adelaide Children's Hospital.

Withall was the architect of the Fox and Anchor, a Grade II listed public house at 115 Charterhouse Street, Farringdon, London, built in 1898.

Family
Withall married Louisa Margaret Reed in Adelaide on 18 April 1876. Their children included:
Richard Henry Withall (10 May 1879 – )
Letitia Withall (30 August 1881 – )
Osborn Withall (27 January 1884 – 1972) returned to South Australia, married Lily Augusta Hall ( – 1976) of Unley on 28 March 1911, lived at "Challana", Streaky Bay
Latham Withall (1886– ) returned to Australia, living in Melbourne; was director of Associated Chambers of Manufactures.

References

Public house architects
South Australian architects
1853 births
1925 deaths
Members of the Order of the British Empire